Sinyeonsu Station is a subway station on Line 1 of the Incheon Subway in Gyeongwon-daero, Yeonsu-gu, Incheon, South Korea.

Station layout

Exits

References

Yeonsu District
Seoul Metropolitan Subway stations
Metro stations in Incheon
Railway stations in South Korea opened in 1999